Kiss Me Kate is a 1953 Metro-Goldwyn-Mayer film adaptation of the 1948 Broadway musical of the same name.

Inspired by William Shakespeare's play The Taming of the Shrew, it tells the tale of formerly married musical theater actors Fred Graham and Lilli Vanessi brought together to star opposite one another in the roles of Petruchio and Katherine in a Broadway musical version of Shakespeare's play.

Already on poor terms, the pair skirmish from the start then break into an all-out emotional war mid-performance that threatens the production's success. The only thing keeping the show together are threats from a pair of gangsters who have come to collect a gambling debt.

Dorothy Kingsley's screenplay, which was nominated for a Writers Guild of America Award, was adapted from the musical's book by Bella and Samuel Spewack. The songs were by Cole Porter, with musical underscoring by Saul Chaplin and André Previn, who were nominated for an Oscar. Hermes Pan choreographed most of the dance routines.

The movie was filmed in 3-D, using the most advanced technology then available. Devotees of the stereoscopic 3-D medium usually cite this film as one of the best examples of a Hollywood release in polarized 3D.

Plot
Fred Graham and Lilli Vanessi, a divorced couple, meet at Fred's apartment to hear Cole Porter perform the score for Kiss Me Kate, his musical version of The Taming of the Shrew, to be directed by Fred. Lois Lane arrives to audition for the Bianca role ("Too Darn Hot"). Lilli decides against performing the lead of “Katherine”, opposite Fred in the male lead of Petruchio, as she is leaving to marry a rich Texas rancher. She changes her mind when Cole and Fred manipulate her by offering Lois the lead role.

Lois' boyfriend, Bill Calhoun, is playing Lucentio in the play. He leads a gambling lifestyle, which results in owing a local gangster $2,000, but he has signed the IOU in Fred's name. Lois laments his bad-boy lifestyle ("Why Can't You Behave?").

After a fiery confrontation during rehearsals, Fred and Lilli get together in her dressing room and reminisce about happier times ("Wunderbar"). Fred later sends flowers and a card to Lois, but his butler mistakenly gives them to Lilli. Lilli is overcome by this romantic gesture and fails to read the card ("So In Love (Reprise)").

The play opens, with Fred, Lilli, Lois and Bill performing an opening number ("We Open In Venice"). In the play, Bianca, the younger daughter of Baptista, wishes to marry, but her father will not allow it until his elder daughter, Katherine, is married.  Bianca has three suitors – Gremio, Hortensio and Lucentio – and each of them try to win her over. She is prepared to marry anyone ("...any Tom, Dick or Harry...").

Petruchio arrives, seeking a wife ("I've Come To Wive It Wealthily In Padua"), and when he hears of Katherine, he resolves to woo her.  Katherine hates the idea of getting married ("I Hate Men"). When Petruchio serenades Katherine ("Were Thine That Special Face"), Lilli finally reads the card from the flowers. She sees that it is addressed to Lois, and attacks Fred/Petruchio on stage, ad-libbing verbal abuse.  As the curtain comes down, Fred spanks Lilli/Kate. Backstage, Lilli phones her fiancé, Tex, to come and immediately pick her up.

Lippy and Slug, a pair of thugs, arrive to collect from Fred. Fred asks them to keep Lilli from leaving the show so it will be successful enough for Fred to pay the debt.  Lois has learned that Fred has taken responsibility for the IOU and she comes to thank him, but each time she begins to thank him for not being angry about Bill forging his name, Fred kisses her to prevent Lippy and Slug from learning about his deception. Lilli and Bill walk in on the scene and become furious.

In order to keep Lilli from leaving, Slug and Lippy appear on stage, disguised as Petruchio's servants. They have no acting ability, but still manage to amuse the audience. Petruchio sets about "taming the shrew", but later reminisces about his days of philandering ("Where Is The Life That Late I Led?").

During the play's intermission, when Tex arrives to rescue Lilli from the theatre, he is recognized by Lois, an old flame. When Bill is angered by Lois' behavior, she admits that though she loves Bill, she cannot resist the advances of other men ("Always True To You In My Fashion").

The gambling debt is cancelled by the untimely death of Slug and Lippy's boss, so they stop interfering with Lilli's mid-performance departure from the theatre. Fred tells her that she truly belongs in theatre, and also reveals his true feelings for her. She departs, leaving a dejected Fred to be cheered up by Slug and Lippy ("Brush Up Your Shakespeare").

Bianca marries Lucentio. The rejected suitors, Gremio and Hortensio, meet two new girls ("From This Moment On"). At the finale, the show is temporarily halted when Lilli's understudy goes missing. Suddenly, Lilli reappears on stage, delivering Kate's speech about how women should surrender to their husbands ("I'm Ashamed That Women Are So Simple"). Fred is bowled over, and the play reaches its triumphant finale ("Kiss Me Kate"), with Fred and Lilli back together as a real couple.

Cast

 Kathryn Grayson as Lilli Vanessi / "Katherine (Kate)"
 Howard Keel as Fred Graham / "Petruchio"
 Ann Miller as Lois Lane / "Bianca"
 Keenan Wynn as Lippy
 Bobby Van as "Gremio"
 Tommy Rall as Bill Calhoun / "Lucentio"
 James Whitmore as Slug

 Kurt Kasznar as "Baptista"
 Bob Fosse as "Hortensio"
 Ron Randell as Cole Porter
 Willard Parker as Tex Calloway
 Ann Codee as Suzanne, Lili's maid
 Claud Allister as Paul, Fred's valet
 Dave O'Brien as Ralph, the Stage Manager

Cast notes:
Lilli's understudy, Jeanie, is mentioned several times, but never appears.
In the stage musical, Lilli's fiancé is a domineering up-and-coming politician named General Harrison Howle. This character was cut from the film and replaced by Tex Calloway.

Production

Musical numbers
 "So in Love" - Lilli and Fred
 "Too Darn Hot" - Lois
 "Why Can't You Behave" - Lois
 "Kiss Me, Kate" - MGM Studio and Orchestra Chorus
 "Wunderbar" - Lilli and Fred
 "So in Love (Reprise)" - Lilli 
 "We Open in Venice" - Lilli, Fred, Lois, Bill
 "Tom, Dick or Harry" - Lois, Gremio, Bill, Hortensio
 "I've Come to Wive it Wealthily in Padua" - Fred
 "I Hate Men" - Lilli
 "Were Thine That Special Face" - Fred
 "Finale Act One (Kiss Me, Kate)" - Chorus
 "Where Is the Life That Late I Led" - Fred
 "Always True to You in My Fashion" - Lois and Bill
 "Brush Up Your Shakespeare" - Slug and Lippy
 "From This Moment On" - Lois, Bill, Hortensio, Gremio
 "Finale" - Fred and Chorus

Song notes:
The song "Another Op'nin', Another Show" was cut and survives in the film only as an instrumental, with the chorus melody being heard several times. Cole Porter opposed its being cut, so the melody was inserted into "Why Can't You Behave?", as a dance sequence, and is also used as incidental music in several places.
"From this Moment On" was not in the original Broadway production, but was originally from another Cole Porter Broadway show, Out of This World (1953).  It was subsequently added to the stage production in the 1999 revival as a backstage duet between Lilli and Harrison Howell, her love interest in the stage play.

Release
Kiss Me Kate was previewed on October 15, 1953 in four locations, two in 3-D with stereophonic sound (in Columbus, Ohio, and at the Victory Theatre in Evansville, Indiana) and two in 2-D (Loew's theaters in Rochester, New York and Houston). Additional previews took place later in October in Dayton, Ohio (2-D), and at the Majestic Theatre in Dallas (3-D).
Grosses from the 3-D version were 40% higher.

Although Kiss Me Kate is often referred to as the first 3-D musical, Those Redheads From Seattle, also a 3-D musical, was released by Paramount Pictures on October 16.

Reception
The movie had a mostly positive reception. Bosley Crowther of The New York Times called Kiss Me Kate "one of the year's more magnificent musical films ... a beautifully staged, adroitly acted and really superbly sung affair—better, indeed, if one may say so, than the same frolic was on the stage." Variety opened its positive review by stating: "Metro's reputation for turning out top calibre musical pictures is further enhanced with Kiss Me Kate. It's Shakespeare's Taming of the Shrew done over in eminently satisfying fashion via a collaboration of superior song, dance and comedy talents." Harrison's Reports called it "a lively and highly entertaining blend of comedy, music, dancing and romance." John McCarten of The New Yorker was more dismissive, writing that it "does have some engaging tunes, but the book of the original has been so thoroughly laundered that little of the comedy, which ran to fairly bawdy stuff, remains, and Kathryn Grayson and Howard Keel, as a bickering theatrical pair compelled to play opposite each other in Shakespeare, are lacking in vital juices." Richard L. Coe of The Washington Post disliked the changes made to the stage version such as the reduction of "Another Op'nin" and "I Am Ashamed That Women Are So Simple," calling the film "a grand musical with lots of pleasures to recommend it. But if you're familiar with what they had to work with, you'll not be enthusiastic, a form of criticism with which not all agree, but in this case I don't see how it's to be avoided." The Monthly Film Bulletin wrote, "The execution generally—sets, costumes, dance numbers, the Cole Porter songs—is pleasing, but the direction lacks flair and the film seems somewhat over-long."

Box-office
According to MGM records the film earned $2,011,000 in the US and Canada and $1,106,000 elsewhere, for a worldwide gross revenue of $3,117,000. Gross profit was $1,136,000, but high production costs led to a net loss of $544,000.

References
Informational notes

Citations

Further reading

External links
 
 
 
 

1953 films
1953 musical comedy films
1953 romantic comedy films
American musical comedy films
American romantic comedy films
American romantic musical films
Films directed by George Sidney
Films based on The Taming of the Shrew
Films scored by André Previn
Films scored by Saul Chaplin
Metro-Goldwyn-Mayer films
1953 3D films
Films based on musicals
American 3D films
1950s English-language films
1950s American films